Anchinia daphnella is a species of moth of the family Depressariidae. It is found in most of Europe, except the Iberian Peninsula, Great Britain, Ireland, the Benelux and Greece. In the east, the range extends to the eastern part of the Palearctic realm.

The wingspan is 23–26 mm.

The larvae feed on Daphne mezereum.

References

External links
lepiforum.de

Moths described in 1775
Anchinia
Moths of Europe